Andrew Blair may refer to:
Andrew George Blair (1844–1907), Canadian politician
Andrew M. Blair (1818–???), American politician in Wisconsin
Andy Blair (ice hockey) (1908–1977), Canadian hockey player
Andy Blair (footballer) (born 1959), Scottish former footballer